Maia Kobabe (born 1989) is an American cartoonist and author.

Life and career
Kobabe graduated with an MFA in Comics from California College of the Arts. Kobabe's work features themes of "identity, sexuality, anti-fascism, fairy tales and homesickness."

Kobabe's graphic nonfiction work has been featured in The Nib, The Press Democrat, and SF Weekly, among other publications.

Kobabe's first full-length book Gender Queer: A Memoir was published by Lion Forge Comics in 2019. When asked why Kobabe wrote the book in a Time magazine interview, they said:Gender Queer was made available in some school libraries but was subsequently banned by a school district in Alaska, due to its sexually explicit content. Kobabe responded to the controversy with an opinion piece in The Washington Post, suggesting that accusers were upset less by the sexually explicit images and language than by the LGBTQ themes of the book. Gender Queer was listed as one of the most banned or challenged books in September 2021 by The American Library Association's Office of Intellectual Freedom (OIF). According to a report (September 2022) from PEN America, Kobabe was the second most banned author in US school districts during the 2021–22 school year with Gender Queer the most frequently challenged book, banned in 41 school districts. Discussing a wave of book censorship in early 2022 within the United States in a Slate interview, Kobabe said: In January 2023, Scholastic acquired Saachi's Stories by Kobabe and Lucky Srikumar "in a six-figure auction". The middle-grade graphic novel is scheduled for publication by Scholastic's imprint Graphix in 2025.

Personal life 
Kobabe uses Spivak pronouns and is non-binary and asexual. Kobabe is dyslexic and didn't learn to read until age 11.

Anthologies 
Kobabe has published short comics in the following anthologies:

 Alphabet (Stacked Deck Press, 2016)
 Tabula Idem: A Queer Tarot Comic Anthology (Fortuna Media, 2017)
 The Secret Loves of Geeks (Dark Horse Comics, 2018)
 Gothic Tales of Haunted Love (Bedside Press, 2018) 
 Mine!:  A Celebration of Liberty And Freedom For All Benefiting Planned Parenthood (ComicMix, 2018)
 Faster Than Light, Y’all (Iron Circus Comics, 2018)
 Advanced Death Saves (Lost His Keys Man Comics, 2019)
 How to Wait: An Anthology of Transition (edited by Sage Persing, 2019)
 Theater of Terror: Revenge of the Queers (Northwest Press, 2019)
 Rolled and Told Vol. 2 (Oni Press, 2020)
 Be Gay, Do Comics (IDW Publishing, 2020)

Awards 
 2016 Ignatz Award — Promising New Talent Nominee (Tom O’Bedlam)
 2019 Ignatz Award Outstanding Graphic Novel Nominee (Gender Queer: A Memoir)
 2019 YALSA Great Graphic Novels for Teens Nominee (Gender Queer: A Memoir)
 2020 American Library Association Alex Award Winner (Gender Queer: A Memoir)
 2020 Stonewall Book Awards — Israel Fishman Non-Fiction Honor Book (Gender Queer: A Memoir)

References

External links 
 Official Website

American LGBT artists
Non-binary artists
American non-binary writers
American artists
American cartoonists
LGBT comics creators
Asexual non-binary people
Living people
California College of the Arts alumni
1989 births
Writers with dyslexia